Matyushenko, also transliterated Matiushenko or Matjušenko (Matsiushenka/Maciušenka) is a surname. Notable people with the surname include:

 Mykhailo Matiushenko (1961–2022), Ukrainian Air Force colonel
 Vladimir Matyushenko (born 1971), Belarusian mixed martial artist
 Yelena Matyushenko (born 1961), Soviet diver

See also
 

Ukrainian-language surnames